El Potrero Chico is an internationally renowned rock climbing area in the Mexican state of Nuevo León,  outside the town of Hidalgo, within Sierra del Fraile protected area.

Rock climbing
There is a large range of different climbs, most of them in the 5.8 to 5.13 grade. The type of climbing can range from steep overhanging face to easy slab. The rock is usually quite sharp. The climbs are mostly situated in a canyon at the entrance of the park, while the interior offers undeveloped mountain terrain with many mountain biking routes, ranging from very easy to expert options.

El Potrero draws rock-climbers from throughout Mexico and from around the world. It is considered one of the top 10 locations to sport climb in the world. New routes are continually being developed.

Rock climbers from Austin, Texas, notably, Jeff Jackson, Kevin Gallahger, Craig Pacinda, and Alex Catlin, along with Colorado climber Kurt Smith started developing the area in the 1990s. Development continued in the 21st century, notably by first accentionists Alex Catlin, Ed Wright, and Dane Bass. Many climbers have attempted to build bridges with the local community, but there remains much work to be done.

There are multiple guide books covering the area, some of which are linked under External Links below.

Conservation
The eventual status of the land is uncertain. Much of the area is a "protected zone" (not a Mexican national park), a legal classification of little actual consequence. 

After the Mexican Revolution of 1910, the land within the park was divided amongst the townspeople as per the ejido system. This means that the Hidalgo ejido commission currently owns and controls 99% of the climbing area.

Weather
The temperature can vary quite a lot from day to day and from sunny to shady areas. During the summer months however, it is recommended to climb in the shade only. Due to the shape of the canyon, the weather outside may be cloudy and raining, but sunny inside the potrero. It is always possible to find a shady area. 

In the winter months, the usually daily high is about 18 degrees C° (64 F°) yet some days it can reach close to 25 C° (77 F°). The low is usually about 5-10 C° (41-50 F°), but snow is always possible.

Main climbing areas

Las Estrellas: Located on the east side of the main canyon. 5.9 to 5.12. Mostly single pitch climbs.

Club Mex: Home to a number of hard, single pitch climbs as well as the 8 pitch classic, Supernova (5.11a).

Mini super Wall: Directly across from the Central Scrutinizer Wall. The first handful of climbs encountered here are good warm up routes ranging from 5.8 to 5.9+. The route El Volvo Scorcho (5.9 and requires 9 quickdraws) is named after the car accident that almost killed the first ascentionist, Dane Bass.

Mota Wall: One of the most popular walls located on the Lower Sense of Religion. Mota Wall houses many of the classic climbs at El Potrero such as La Vaca and Double Cherry Pie.
Easily accessed area. Many easy to medium range climbs.

Mileski Wall: Above the Mota Wall. Hard overhanging climbs.

The spires: Very popular areas. Two rock horns about 200' tall on the west side of the canyon. 

Outrage Wall: Many beautiful climbs in the mid 10s to 12 range.

The Surf: 15 minutes walk from the spires, hard overhanging from 5.12a to 5.13b.

Central Srutinizer, Virgin canyon: West of the canyon.

El Sendero Luminoso: This area is found before entering the main canyon, on the west side. It     
is where the climb El Sendero Luminoso  a long difficult route with 10 pitches of 5.12, is situated (15 pitches).

Wonder Wall: This new wall is located inside the swimming pool complex. These routes are up the stairs by the B-BQ grills. They range from 5.6 to 5.11b, but most routes are in the 9 and 10 range.

Multi-Pitch Climbs
Yankee Clipper - 15 Pitches (5.8 to 5.12c) http://www.elpotrerochicoguides.com/yankee-clipper

Snott Girlz - 7 Pitches (5.9 to 5.10+)

Timewave Zero - 23 Pitches (5.7 to 5.12) http://www.elpotrerochicoguides.com/time-wave-zero

Pancho Villa Rides Again - 5 Pitches (5.9 to 5.11d)

Treasure of Sierra Madre - 7 Pitches (5.7 to 5.10c)

Estrellita - 12 Pitches (5.7 to 5.10b) 
http://www.elpotrerochicoguides.com/estrellita

Agua De Coco - 3 Pitches (5.10a to 5.10d)

Black Cat Bone - 9 Pitches (5.6 to 5.10d)

Space Boyz - 11 Pitches (5.8 to 5.10d) http://www.elpotrerochicoguides.com/space-boyz

The Devil's Tongue - 3 pitches (5.9 to 5.12a)

Supernova - 8 pitches (5.6 to 5.11a, more pitches being added)

Access Denied - 4 Pitches (5.9 to 5.10c)

Dope Ninja - 6 Pitches (5.6 to 5.10)

Other climbing areas near Monterrey
La Huasteca
El Salto
Culo de Gato
Puente de Dios
Cubia Cave

External links

Potrero Chico Online Guide
Potrero Chico Climbing Guidebook
Mountain Project: Potrero Chico

Climbing areas of Mexico
Climbing areas of Nuevo León
Landforms of Nuevo León
Tourist attractions in Nuevo León
Rock formations of Mexico